Chepauk Super Gillies is a cricket team representing Chennai city in the  Tamil Nadu Premier League (TNPL). The team is owned by Metronation Chennai Television Private Limited. Chepauk Super Gillies were crowned Tamil Nadu Premier League champions for Three times.

Franchise history 
Metronation Chennai Television Pvt. Ltd bought the team based on South Chennai (Rs 5.13 crore) & Hemang Badani was announced as the Coach of the side ahead of the TNPL Draft in 2016.

The Metronation Television Chennai Pvt. Ltd. announced the name of its Tamil Nadu Premier League franchise and unveiled the logo. The team, ‘Chepauk Super Gillies’, & tagline ‘ Pattaya Kelappu’, and its logo comprises a helmet, two bails, and a lighthouse.

Team history

TNPL Season 1 (2016) 

Players: R Sathish, Yo Mahesh, Thalaivan Sargunam, Anthony Dhas, Gopinath, Sai Kishore, Sasidev, Joel Joseph, Tamil Kumaran, Alaxander R, Vasanth Saravanan S, Rahul B, Ashwath Mukunthan, Karthik S, Rajeel Abdul Rahman, Nirmal Kumar, Vasudevan, Aditya Barooah, Shibi Jawahar.

TNPL Season 2 (2017) 

Squad: Rajagopal Sathish, Yo Mahesh, Thalaivan Sargunam, Antony Dhas, Gopinath, Ravisrinivasan Sai Kishore, Uthirasamy Sasidev, Joel Joseph, Dakshinamoorthy Kumaran, R Alexander, Sathiamoorty Saravanan, Baskaran Rahul, Ashwath Mukunthan, S Karthik, Aditya Barooah, Jothimani Gowjith Subhash, Arun Kumar, Rangaraj Suthesh, S Radhakrishnan.

TNPL Season 3 (2018) 

 Ganga Sridhar Raju
 MK Shivakumar
 Uthirasamy Sasidev
 Baskaran Rahul
 Vijay Shankar
 Harish Kumar
 Gopinath
 S Karthik
 Aarif A
 M Ashwin
 Sunny Kumar Singh
 Samruddh Bhat
 Arun Kumar
 Manimaran Siddharth
 R Alexander
 B Arun

TNPL Season 4 (2019) 
Chepauk Super Gillies Player's
 A Aarif
 B Arun
 Dev Rahul
 G Periyaswamy
 Ganga Sridhar Raju
 Hari Gopinath
 Harish Kumar
 Kaushik Gandhi
 Manimaran Siddharth
 Murugan Ashwin
 R Alexander
 Umashankar Sushil
 Uthirasamy Sasidev
 Vijay Shankar

TNPL Season 5 (2021) 
Chepauk Super Gillies Players
 Arun Kumar
 B Arun
 Dev Rahul
 Harish Kumar
 Jaganath Sinivas
 Kaushik Gandhi
 Manimaran Siddharth
 N Jagadeesan
 Nilesh Subramanian
 R Alexander
 Rajagopal Sathish
 Ravisrinivasan Sai Kishore
 S Radhakrishnan
 S Sujay
 Sandeep Warrier
 Sonu Yadav
 Uthirasamy Sasidev

Current squad 

 Ramadoss Alexander
 B Arun
 Arun Kumar 
 Kaushik Gandhi
 S Harish Kumar
 Narayan Jagadeesan
 RS Jaganath Sinivas
 S Karthik
 S Madhan Kumar
 R Nilesh Subramanian
 Prashid Akash
 Radhakrishnan
 Dev Rahul
 Ravisrinivasan Sai Kishore
 Sai Prakash
 Sandeep Warrier
 Uhirasamy Sasidev
 Rajagopal Sathish
 M Siddharth
 Sonu Yadav
 S Sujay
 Vijay Kumar

Support staff 
Coach : Hemang Badani

Statistics 
Highest Wicket-Taker of the Tournament - Sai Kishore (17 Wickets - TNPL 2017)

Most Energetic Player of the Tournament - Sasidev (TNPL 2017)

Most Runs for Chepauk Super Gillies in TNPL 2016 - K H Gopinath (273 Runs)

Achievements 

 Chepauk Super Gillies met Tuti Patriots in the final of season 2 and won by 6 wickets.

References

Tamil Nadu Premier League
Sport in Chennai
Cricket in Chennai
Sport in Tamil Nadu